The Hastings Units were three classes of diesel-electric multiple unit which were built by BR(S) in the late 1950s, and operated until the mid-1980s.

British Rail Class 201 (6S)
British Rail Class 202 (6L)
British Rail Class 203 (6B)